New Milford may refer to:

United States
 New Milford, Connecticut, a town
 New Milford (CDP), Connecticut, census-designated place comprising the town center
 New Milford, Illinois
 New Milford, New Hampshire, a fictitious town described in a hoax article
 New Milford, New Jersey
 New Milford, New York, a hamlet in Warwick
 New Milford, Ohio
 New Milford, Pennsylvania

Wales
 New Milford, a name earlier used for Neyland railway station, Pembrokeshire, Wales